Below is a list of museums in Djibouti.

List
 Djibouti Museum

See also
 List of museums

External links
 Museums in Djibouti

Djibouti
Djibouti
Museums